Knoxville is a city in and the county seat of Knox County in the U.S. state of Tennessee. As of the 2020 United States census, Knoxville's population was 190,740, making it the largest city in the East Tennessee Grand Division and the state's third largest city after Nashville and Memphis. Knoxville is the principal city of the Knoxville Metropolitan Statistical Area, which had an estimated population of 869,046 in 2019.

First settled in 1786, Knoxville was the first capital of Tennessee. The city struggled with geographic isolation throughout the early 19th century. The arrival of the railroad in 1855 led to an economic boom. The city was bitterly divided over the secession issue during the American Civil War and was occupied alternately by Confederate and Union armies, culminating in the Battle of Fort Sanders in 1863. Following the war, Knoxville grew rapidly as a major wholesaling and manufacturing center. The city's economy stagnated after the 1920s as the manufacturing sector collapsed, the downtown area declined and city leaders became entrenched in highly partisan political fights. Hosting the 1982 World's Fair helped reinvigorate the city, and revitalization initiatives by city leaders and private developers have had major successes in spurring growth in the city, especially the downtown area.

Knoxville is the home of the flagship campus of the University of Tennessee, whose sports teams, the Tennessee Volunteers, are popular in the surrounding area. Knoxville is also home to the headquarters of the Tennessee Valley Authority, the Tennessee Supreme Court's courthouse for East Tennessee, and the corporate headquarters of several national and regional companies. As one of the largest cities in the Appalachian region, Knoxville has positioned itself in recent years as a repository of Appalachian culture and is one of the gateways to the Great Smoky Mountains National Park.

History

Early history
The first people to form substantial settlements in what is now Knoxville were indigenous people who arrived during the Woodland period. One of the oldest artificial structures in Knoxville is a burial mound constructed during the early Mississippian culture period. The earthwork mound has been preserved, but the campus of the University of Tennessee developed around it.

Other prehistoric sites include an Early Woodland habitation area at the confluence of the Tennessee River and Knob Creek (near the Knox–Blount county line), and Dallas phase Mississippian villages at Post Oak Island (also along the river near the Knox–Blount line), and at Bussell Island (at the mouth of the Little Tennessee River near Lenoir City).

By the 18th century, the Cherokee, an Iroquoian language people, had become the dominant tribe in the East Tennessee region; they are believed to have migrated centuries before from the Great Lakes area. They were consistently at war with the Creek (who spoke Muskogee) and Shawnee (who spoke Central Algonquian). The Cherokee people called the Knoxville area kuwanda'talun'yi, which means "Mulberry Place". Most Cherokee habitation in the area was concentrated in what the American colonists called the Overhill settlements along the Little Tennessee River, southwest of Knoxville.

The first white traders and explorers were recorded as arriving in the Tennessee Valley in the late 17th century. There is significant evidence that Spanish explorer Hernando de Soto visited Bussell Island in 1540. The first major recorded Euro-American presence in the Knoxville area was the Timberlake Expedition, which passed through the confluence of the Holston and French Broad into the Tennessee River in December 1761. Henry Timberlake, an Anglo-American emissary from the Thirteen Colonies to the Overhill settlements along the Little Tennessee River, recalled being pleased by the deep waters of the Tennessee after his party had struggled down the relatively shallow Holston for several weeks.

Settlement

The end of the French and Indian War and confusion brought about by the American Revolution led to a drastic increase in Euro-American settlement west of the Appalachians. By the 1780s, white settlers were already established in the Holston and French Broad valleys. The U.S. Congress ordered all illegal settlers out of the valley in 1785, but with little success. As settlers continued to trickle into Cherokee lands, tensions between the settlers and the Cherokee rose steadily.

In 1786, James White, a Revolutionary War officer, and his friend James Connor built White's Fort near the mouth of First Creek, on land White had purchased three years earlier. In 1790, White's son-in-law, Charles McClung—who had arrived from Pennsylvania the previous year—surveyed White's holdings between First Creek and Second Creek for the establishment of a town. McClung drew up 64  lots. The waterfront was set aside for a town common. Two lots were set aside for a church and graveyard (First Presbyterian Church, founded 1792). Four lots were set aside for a school. That school was eventually chartered as Blount College and it served as the starting point for the University of Tennessee, which uses Blount College's founding date of 1794, as its own. Also in 1790, President George Washington appointed North Carolina surveyor William Blount governor of the newly created Territory South of the River Ohio.

One of Blount's first tasks was to meet with the Cherokee and establish territorial boundaries and resolve the issue of illegal settlers. This he accomplished almost immediately with the Treaty of Holston, which was negotiated and signed at White's Fort in 1791. Blount originally wanted to place the territorial capital at the confluence of the Clinch River and Tennessee River (now Kingston), but when the Cherokee refused to cede this land, Blount chose White's Fort, which McClung had surveyed the previous year. Blount named the new capital Knoxville after Revolutionary War general and Secretary of War Henry Knox, who at the time was Blount's immediate superior.

Problems immediately arose from the Holston Treaty. Blount believed that he had "purchased" much of what is now East Tennessee when the treaty was signed in 1791. However, the terms of the treaty came under dispute, culminating in continued violence on both sides. When the government invited Cherokee chief Hanging Maw for negotiations in 1793, Knoxville settlers attacked the Cherokee against orders, killing the chief's wife. Peace was renegotiated in 1794.

Antebellum era

Knoxville served as capital of the Southwest Territory and as capital of Tennessee (admitted as a state in 1796) until 1817, when the capital was moved to Murfreesboro. Early Knoxville has been described as an "alternately quiet and rowdy river town". Early issues of the Knoxville Gazette—the first newspaper published in Tennessee—are filled with accounts of murder, theft, and hostile Cherokee attacks. Abishai Thomas, a friend of William Blount, visited Knoxville in 1794 and wrote that, while he was impressed by the town's modern frame buildings, the town had "seven taverns" and no church.

Knoxville initially thrived as a way station for travelers and migrants heading west. Its location at the confluence of three major rivers in the Tennessee Valley brought flatboat and later steamboat traffic to its waterfront in the first half of the 19th century, and Knoxville quickly developed into a regional merchandising center. Local agricultural products—especially tobacco, corn, and whiskey—were traded for cotton, which was grown in the Deep South. The population of Knoxville more than doubled in the 1850s with the arrival of the East Tennessee and Georgia Railroad in 1855.'

Among the most prominent citizens of Knoxville during the Antebellum years was James White's son, Hugh Lawson White (1773–1840). White first served as a judge and state senator, before being nominated by the state legislature to replace Andrew Jackson in the U.S. Senate in 1825. In 1836, White ran unsuccessfully for president, representing the Whig Party.

American Civil War

Anti-slavery and anti-secession sentiment ran high in East Tennessee in the years leading up to the American Civil War. William "Parson" Brownlow, the radical publisher of the Knoxville Whig, was one of the region's leading anti-secessionists (although he strongly defended the practice of slavery). Blount County, just south of Knoxville, had developed into a center of abolitionist activity, due in part to its relatively large Quaker faction and the anti-slavery president of Maryville College, Isaac Anderson. The Greater Warner Tabernacle AME Zion Church, Knoxville was reportedly a station on the underground railroad.

Business interests, however, guided largely by Knoxville's trade connections with cotton-growing centers to the south, contributed to the development of a strong pro-secession movement within the city. The city's pro-secessionists included among their ranks Dr. J. G. M. Ramsey, a prominent historian whose father had built the Ramsey House in 1797.

Thus, while East Tennessee and greater Knox County voted decisively against secession in 1861, the city of Knoxville favored secession by a 2-1 margin. In late May 1861, just before the secession vote, delegates of the East Tennessee Convention met at Temperance Hall in Knoxville in hopes of keeping Tennessee in the Union. After Tennessee voted to secede in June, the convention met in Greeneville and attempted to create a separate Union-aligned state in East Tennessee.

In July 1861, after Tennessee had joined the Confederacy, General Felix Zollicoffer arrived in Knoxville as commander of the District of East Tennessee. While initially lenient toward the city's Union sympathizers, Zollicoffer instituted martial law in November, after pro-Union guerrillas burned seven of the city's bridges. The command of the district passed briefly to George Crittenden and then to Kirby Smith, who launched an unsuccessful invasion of Kentucky in August 1862. In early 1863, General Simon Buckner took command of Confederate forces in Knoxville. Anticipating a Union invasion, Buckner fortified Fort Loudon (in West Knoxville, not to be confused with the colonial fort to the southwest) and began constructing earthworks throughout the city. However, the approach of stronger Union forces under Ambrose Burnside in the summer of 1863 forced Buckner to evacuate Knoxville before the earthworks were completed.

Burnside arrived in early September 1863, beginning the Knoxville Campaign. Like the Confederates, he immediately began fortifying the city. The Union forces rebuilt Fort Loudon and erected 12 other forts and batteries flanked by entrenchments around the city. Burnside moved a pontoon bridge upstream from Loudon, allowing Union forces to cross the river and build a series of forts along the heights of South Knoxville, including Fort Stanley and Fort Dickerson.

As Burnside was fortifying Knoxville, a Confederate army under Braxton Bragg defeated Union forces under William S. Rosecrans at the Battle of Chickamauga (near the Tennessee-Georgia line) and laid siege to Chattanooga. On November 3, 1863, the Confederates sent General James Longstreet to attack Burnside at Knoxville and prevent him from reinforcing the Union at Chattanooga. Longstreet wanted to attack the city from the south, but lacking the necessary pontoon bridges, he was forced to cross the river further downstream at Loudon (November 14) and march against the city's heavily fortified western section. On November 15, General Joseph Wheeler unsuccessfully attempted to dislodge Union forces in the heights of South Knoxville, and the following day Longstreet failed to cut off retreating Union forces at the Battle of Campbell's Station (now Farragut). On November 18, Union General William P. Sanders was mortally wounded while conducting delaying maneuvers west of Knoxville, and Fort Loudon was renamed Fort Sanders in his honor. On November 29, following a two-week siege, the Confederates attacked Fort Sanders, but failed after a fierce 20-minute engagement. On December 4, after word of the Confederate defeat at Chattanooga reached Longstreet, he broke his siege of Knoxville and went into winter quarters at Russellville. He rejoined the Army of Northern Virginia the following spring. The Union victory in the Knoxville Campaign and at Chattanooga put much of East Tennessee under Union control for the rest of the war.

Reconstruction and the Industrial Age

After the war, northern investors such as brothers Joseph and David Richards helped Knoxville recover relatively quickly. The Richards brothers convinced 104 Welsh immigrant families to migrate from the Welsh Tract in Pennsylvania to work in a rolling mill then co-owned by Thomas Walker. These Welsh families settled in an area now known as Mechanicsville. The Richards brothers also co-founded the Knoxville Iron Works beside the L&N Railroad, also employing Welsh workers. Later, the site was used as the grounds for the 1982 World's Fair.

Other companies that sprang up during this period were Knoxville Woolen Mills, Dixie Cement, and Woodruff's Furniture. Between 1880 and 1887, 97 factories were established in Knoxville, most of them specializing in textiles, food products, and iron products. By the 1890s, Knoxville was home to more than 50 wholesaling houses, making it the third largest wholesaling center by volume in the South. The Candoro Marble Works, established in the community of Vestal in 1914, became the nation's foremost producer of pink marble and one of the nation's largest marble importers. In 1896, Knoxville celebrated its achievements by creating its own flag. The Flag of Knoxville, Tennessee represents the city's progressive growth due to agriculture and industry.

In 1869, Thomas Humes, a Union sympathizer and president of East Tennessee University, secured federal post-war damage reimbursement and state-designated Morrill Act funding to expand the college, which had been occupied by both armies during the war. Charles Dabney, who became president of the university in 1887, overhauled the faculty and established a law school in an attempt to modernize the scope of the university. In 1879, the state changed its name to the University of Tennessee, at the request of the trustees, who hoped to secure more funding from the Tennessee state legislature.

The post-war manufacturing boom brought thousands of immigrants to the city. The population of Knoxville grew from around 5,000 in 1860 to 32,637 in 1900. West Knoxville was annexed in 1897, and over 5,000 new homes were built between 1895 and 1904.

In 1901, train robber Kid Curry (whose real name was Harvey Logan), a member of Butch Cassidy's Wild Bunch was captured after shooting two deputies on Knoxville's Central Avenue. He escaped from the Knoxville Jail and rode away on a horse stolen from the sheriff.

The Progressive Era and the Great Depression

Knoxville hosted the Appalachian Exposition in 1910 and 1911 and the National Conservation Exposition in 1913. Around this time, a number of affluent Knoxvillians began purchasing summer cottages in Elkmont and began to pursue the park idea more vigorously. They were led by Knoxville businessman Colonel David C. Chapman, who, as head of the Great Smoky Mountains Park Commission, was largely responsible for raising the funds for the purchase of the property that became the core of the park. The Great Smoky Mountains National Park opened in 1933.

Knoxville's reliance on a manufacturing economy left it particularly vulnerable to the effects of the Great Depression. The Tennessee Valley also suffered from frequent flooding, and millions of acres of farmland had been ruined by soil erosion. To control flooding and improve the economy in the Tennessee Valley, the federal government created the Tennessee Valley Authority in 1933. Beginning with Norris Dam, TVA constructed a series of hydroelectric and other power plants throughout the valley over the next few decades, bringing flood control, jobs, and electricity to the region. The Federal Works Projects Administration, which also arrived in the 1930s, helped build McGhee-Tyson Airport and expand Neyland Stadium. TVA's headquarters, which consists of two twin high rises built in the 1970s, were among Knoxville's first modern high-rise buildings.

In 1947, John Gunther dubbed Knoxville the "ugliest city" in America in his best-selling book Inside U.S.A. Gunther's description jolted the city into enacting a series of beautification measures that helped improve the appearance of the Downtown area.

1982 World's Fair and 20th century

Knoxville's textile and manufacturing industries largely fell victim to foreign competition in the 1950s and 1960s, and after the establishment of the Interstate Highway system in the 1960s, the railroad—which had been largely responsible for Knoxville's industrial growth—began to decline. The rise of suburban shopping malls in the 1970s drew retail revenues away from Knoxville's downtown area. While government jobs and economic diversification prevented widespread unemployment in Knoxville, the city sought to recover the massive loss of revenue by attempting to annex neighboring communities. Knoxville would successfully annex the communities of Bearden and Fountain City, which were Knoxville's biggest suburbs prior to their annexations in 1962. Knoxville officials would attempt the annexation of the neighboring Farragut-Concord community in West Knox County, but would fail following the incorporation of Farragut in 1980. These annexation attempts often turned combative, and several attempts to consolidate Knoxville and Knox County into a metro government failed, while school boards and the planning commissions would merge on July 1, 1987.

With further annexation attempts stalling, Knoxville initiated several projects aimed at boosting revenue in its downtown area. The 1982 World's Fair—the most successful of these projects, with eleven million visitors—became one of the most popular expositions in U.S. history. The fair's energy theme was selected due to Knoxville being the headquarters of the Tennessee Valley Authority and for the city's proximity to the Oak Ridge National Laboratory. The Sunsphere, a  steel truss structure topped with a gold-colored glass sphere, was built for the fair and remains one of Knoxville's most prominent structures, along with the adjacent Tennessee Amphitheater which underwent a renovation that was completed in 2008.

During the 1980s and into the 1990s, the city would see one of its largest expansions of its city limits, with a reported 26 square miles of "shoestring annexation" under the administration of Mayor Victor Ashe. Ashe's efforts would be controversial, largely consisting of annexation of interstate right-of-ways, highway-oriented commercial clusters, and residential subdivisions to increase tax revenue for the city. Residents would voice opposition, citing claims of urban sprawl and government overreach.

21st century and economic renaissance
With the dawn of the 21st century, Knoxville's downtown has been developing, with the opening of the Women's Basketball Hall of Fame and the Knoxville Convention Center, the redevelopment of Market Square, a new visitors center, a regional history museum, a Regal Cinemas theater, several restaurants and bars, and many new and redeveloped condominiums. Since 2000, Knoxville has successfully brought business back to the downtown area. The arts in particular have begun to flourish; there are multiple venues for outdoor concerts, and Gay Street hosts a new arts annex and gallery surrounded by many studios and new businesses as well. The Bijou and Tennessee Theatres underwent renovation, providing an initiative for the city and its developers to re-purpose the old downtown.

Development has also expanded across the Tennessee River on the South Knoxville waterfront. In 2006, the City of Knoxville adopted the South Waterfront Vision Plan, a long-term improvement project to revitalize the 750 acre waterfront fronting three miles of shoreline on the Tennessee River. The project's primary focus is the commercial and residential development over a 20-year timeline. The former Knoxville Baptist Hospital, located on the waterfront, was demolished in 2016 to make for mixed-use project called One Riverwalk. The development consisted of three office buildings, including a new headquarters for Regal Entertainment Group, a hotel, student housing, and 300 multi-family residential units.

In June 2020, the Knoxville City Council announced the investment of over $5.5million dollars in federal and local funds towards the development of a business park along the Interstate 275 corridor in North Knoxville. The project was first proposed by a study prepared Knoxville-Knox County Metropolitan Planning Commission in 2007.

In August 2020, UT President and Tennessee Smokies owner Randy Boyd announced plans of a mixed-use baseball stadium complex in the Old City neighborhood of Knoxville.

Geography

Topography

Knoxville is situated in the Great Appalachian Valley (known locally as the Tennessee Valley), about halfway between the Great Smoky Mountains to the east and the Cumberland Plateau to the west. The Great Valley is part of a sub-range of the Appalachian Mountains known as the Ridge-and-Valley Appalachians, which is characterized by long, narrow ridges, flanked by broad valleys. Prominent Ridge-and-Valley structures in the Knoxville area include Sharp's Ridge and Beaver Ridge in the northern part of the city, Brown Mountain in South Knoxville, parts of Bays Mountain just south of the city, and parts of McAnnally Ridge in the northeastern part of the city.

The Tennessee River, which slices through the downtown area, is formed in southeastern Knoxville at the confluence of the Holston River, which flows southwest from Virginia, and the French Broad River, which flows west from North Carolina. Notable tributaries of the Tennessee in Knoxville include First Creek and Second Creek, which flow through the downtown area, Third Creek, which flows west of U.T., and Sinking Creek, Ten Mile Creek, and Turkey Creek, which drain West Knoxville.

Climate
Knoxville falls in the humid subtropical climate (Köppen: Cfa). Winters are generally much cooler and less stable, with occasional small amounts of snow. Usually no snow occurs outside of January and February.

Metropolitan Area

Knoxville is the central city in the Knoxville Metropolitan Area, an Office of Management and Budget (OMB)-designated metropolitan statistical area (MSA) that covers Knox, Anderson, Blount, Campbell, Grainger, Loudon, Morgan, Roane and Union counties. MSAs consist of a core urban center and the outlying communities and rural areas with which it maintains close economic ties. They are not administrative divisions, and should not be confused with a consolidated city-county government, which Knoxville and Knox County is absent of.

The Knoxville Metropolitan area includes unincorporated communities such as Halls Crossroads, Powell, Karns, Corryton, Concord, and Mascot, which are located in Knox County outside of Knoxville's city limits. Along with Knoxville, major municipalities in the Knoxville Metropolitan Area include Alcoa, Blaine, Maryville, Lenoir City, Loudon, Farragut, Oak Ridge, Rutledge, Clinton, Bean Station, and Maynardville. As of 2012, the population of the Knoxville Metropolitan Area was 837,571.

Additionally, the Knoxville MSA is the chief component of the larger OMB-designated Knoxville-Sevierville-La Follette TN Combined Statistical Area (CSA). The CSA also includes the Morristown Metropolitan Statistical Area (Hamblen, Grainger, and Jefferson counties) and the Sevierville (Sevier County), La Follette (Campbell County), Harriman (Roane County), and Newport (Cocke County) Micropolitan Statistical Areas. Municipalities in the CSA, but not the Knoxville MSA, include Morristown, Rutledge, Dandridge, Jefferson City, Sevierville, Gatlinburg, Pigeon Forge, LaFollette, Jacksboro, Harriman, Kingston, Rockwood, and Newport. The combined population of the CSA as of the 2000 Census was 935,659. Its estimated 2008 population was 1,041,955.

Georgia Tech researchers have mapped the Knoxville Metropolitan area as one of the 18 'Major Cities' in the Piedmont Atlantic Megaregion.

Cityscape

Architecture

Knoxville's two tallest buildings are the 27-story First Tennessee Plaza and the 24-story Riverview Tower, both on Gay Street. Other prominent high-rises include the Tower at Morgan Hill (21 stories), the Andrew Johnson Building (18), the Knoxville Hilton (18), the General Building (15), the Holston (14), the TVA Towers (12), and Sterchi Lofts (12). The city's most iconic structure is arguably the Sunsphere, a  steel truss tower built for the 1982 World's Fair and, with the Tennessee Amphitheater, one of only two structures that remain from that World's Fair.

The downtown area contains a mixture of architectural styles from various periods, ranging from the hewn-log James White House (1786) to the modern Knoxville Museum of Art (1990). Styles represented include Greek Revival (Old City Hall), Victorian (Hotel St. Oliver and Sullivan's Saloon), Gothic (Church Street Methodist Church and Ayres Hall), Neoclassical (First Baptist Church), and Art Deco (Knoxville Post Office). Gay Street, Market Square, and Jackson Avenue contain numerous examples of late-19th and early-20th century commercial architecture.

Residential architecture tends to reflect the city's development over two centuries. Blount Mansion (1791), in the oldest part of the city, is designed in a vernacular Georgian style. "Streetcar suburbs" such as Fourth and Gill, Parkridge, and Fort Sanders, developed in the late 19th century with the advent of trolleys, tend to contain large concentrations of Victorian and Bungalow/Craftsman-style houses popular during this period. Early automobile suburbs, such as Lindbergh Forest and Sequoyah Hills, contain late-1920s and 1930s styles such as Tudor Revival, English Cottage, and Mission Revival. Neighborhoods developed after World War II typically consist of Ranch-style houses.

Knoxville is home to the nation's largest concentration of homes designed by noted Victorian residential architect George Franklin Barber, who lived in the city. Other notable local architects include members of the Baumann family, Charles I. Barber (son of George), R. F. Graf, and more recently, Bruce McCarty. Nationally renowned architects with works still standing in the city include Alfred B. Mullett (Greystone), John Russell Pope (H.L. Dulin House), and Edward Larrabee Barnes (Knoxville Museum of Art).

Neighborhoods
Knoxville is roughly divided into the Downtown area and sections based on the four cardinal directions: North Knoxville, South Knoxville, East Knoxville, and West Knoxville. Downtown Knoxville traditionally consists of the area bounded by the river on the south, First Creek on the east, Second Creek on the west, and the railroad tracks on the north, though the definition has expanded to include the U.T. campus and Fort Sanders neighborhood, and several neighborhoods along or just off Broadway south of Sharp's Ridge ("Downtown North"). While primarily home to the city's central business district and municipal offices, the Old City and Gay Street are mixed residential and commercial areas.

South Knoxville consists of the parts of the city located south of the river, and includes the neighborhoods of Vestal, Lindbergh Forest, Island Home Park, Colonial Hills, and Old Sevier. This area contains major commercial corridors along Chapman Highway and Alcoa Highway.

West Knoxville generally consists of the areas west of U.T., and includes the suburban neighborhoods of Sequoyah Hills, West Hills, Bearden, Cumberland Estates, Westmoreland, Suburban Hills, Cedar Bluff, Rocky Hill, and Ebenezer. This area, concentrated largely around Kingston Pike, is home to thriving retail centers such as West Town Mall and Turkey Creek.

East Knoxville consists of the areas east of First Creek and the James White Parkway and includes the neighborhoods of Parkridge, Burlington, Morningside, and Five Points. This area, concentrated along Magnolia Avenue, is home to Chilhowee Park and Zoo Knoxville.

North Knoxville consists of the areas north of Sharp's Ridge, namely the Fountain City and Inskip-Norwood areas. This area's major commercial corridor is located along Broadway.

List of notable neighborhoods

 Bearden
 Cedar Bluff
 Chilhowee Park
 Colonial Village
 Cumberland Estates
 Downtown
 Emory Place
 Fort Sanders
 Fountain City
 Oakland (former)
 Fourth & Gill
 Island Home Park
 Lindbergh Forest
 Lonsdale
 Mechanicsville
 North Hills
 Oakwood-Lincoln Park
 Old City
 Old North Knoxville
 Parkridge
 Rocky Hill
 Sequoyah Hills
 South Knoxville
 West Hills

Important suburbs

 Alcoa
 Blaine
 Clinton
 Concord
 Corryton
 Dandridge
 Farragut
 Halls Crossroads
 Hardin Valley
 Heiskell
 Karns
 Lenoir City
 Louisville
 Maryville
 Mascot
 Maynardville
 Oak Ridge
 Powell
 Sevierville
 Seymour
 Strawberry Plains

Demographics

2020 census

As of the 2020 United States census, there were 190,740 people, 83,492 households, and 40,405 families residing in the city.

2010 census
As of the census of 2010, the population of Knoxville was 178,874, a 2.9% increase from 2000. The median age was 32.7, with 19.1% of the population under the age of 18, and 12.6% over the age of 65. The population was 48% male and 52% female. The population density was 1,815 persons per square mile.

The racial and ethnic composition of the city was 76.1% white, 17.1% black, 0.4% Native American, 1.6% Asian, and 0.2% Pacific Islander. Hispanic or Latino of any race were 4.6% of the population. People reporting more than one race formed 2.5% of the population.

Data collected by the Census from 2005 to 2009 reported 83,151 households in Knoxville, with an average of 2.07 persons per household. The home ownership rate was 51%, and 74.7% of residents had been living in the same house for more than one year. The median household income was $32,609, and the per capita income was $21,528. High school graduates were 83.8% of persons 25 and older, and 28.3% had earned a bachelor's degree or higher. The city's poverty rate was 25%, compared with 16.1% in Tennessee and 15.1% nationwide.

According to the opinion of the Economic Research Institute in a 2006 study, Knoxville was identified as the most affordable U.S. city for new college graduates, based on the ratio of typical salary to cost of living. In 2014, Forbes ranked Knoxville one of the top five most affordable cities in the United States.

Crime
FBI Uniform Crime Reports for Knoxville for 2017:

Economy
After the arrival of the railroads in the 1850s, Knoxville grew to become a major wholesaling and manufacturing center. Following the collapse of the city's textile industry in the 1950s, Knoxville's economy grew more diversified. In 2011, 15.9% of the Knoxville Metropolitan Statistical Area's (MSA) work force was employed by government entities, while 14.1% were employed in the professional service sector, 14% worked in education or health care, 12.7% were employed in the retail sector, 10.5% worked in leisure and hospitality, and 8.9% worked in the manufacturing sector. The region had an unemployment rate of 7.9% in 2011.

In the 2010 ACCRA Cost of Living Index, Knoxville was rated 89.6 (the national average was 100). Kiplinger ranked Knoxville at No. 5 in its list of Best Value Cities 2011 citing "college sports, the Smoky Mountains and an entrepreneurial spirit". In April 2008, Forbes magazine named Knoxville among the Top 10 Metropolitan Hotspots in the United States, and within Forbes's Top5 for Business & Careers, just behind cities like New York and Los Angeles.

In 2007, there were over 19,000 registered businesses in Knoxville. The city's businesses are served by the 2,100-member Knoxville Area Chamber Partnership. The Knoxville Chamber is one of six partners in the Knoxville-Oak Ridge Innovation Valley, which promotes economic development in Knox and surrounding counties.

Major corporations
The Tennessee Valley Authority (TVA), the nation's largest public power provider, is a federally owned corporation headquartered in Knoxville. TVA reported $10.5billion in revenue in 2021 and employs over 12,000 region-wide.

The largest company based in Knoxville is privately held Pilot Flying J, the nation's largest truck stop chain and sixth largest private company, which reported over $29.23billion in revenue in 2012. Knoxville is also home to the nation's fourth largest wholesale grocer, The H. T. Hackney Company, which reported $3.8billion in revenue in 2012, and one of the nation's largest digital-centric advertising firms, Tombras Group, which reported $80million in revenue in 2011. Other notable privately held companies based in the city include Bush Brothers, Sea Ray (and its parent company, Brunswick Boat Group), Thermocopy, Petro's Chili & Chips, EdFinancial, 21st Mortgage and AC Entertainment. Also based in Knoxville are movie theater chain Regal Cinemas, major operations of Discovery, Inc. (which acquired Scripps Networks Interactive), and health care-staffing firm TeamHealth.

Major companies located within the Knoxville MSA include Clayton Homes and Ruby Tuesday (both in Maryville), and DeRoyal and Weigel's (both in Powell).

Real estate
As of 2011, the median price for a home in the Knoxville MSA was $140,900, compared with $173,300 nationally. The average apartment rental was $658 per month. In March 2009, CNN ranked Knoxville as the 59th city in the top 100 US metro areas in terms of real estate price depreciation.

The Knoxville area is home to 596 office buildings which contain over 21million square feet of office space. As of 2010, the average rental rate per square foot was $14.79. The city's largest office building in terms of office space is the City-County Building, which has over 537,000 square feet of office space. The First Tennessee Plaza and the Riverview Tower were the largest privately owned office buildings, with 469,672 square feet and 367,000 square feet, respectively.

Knoxville's largest industrial park is the  Forks of the River Industrial Park in southeastern Knoxville. Other major industrial and business parks include the  EastBridge Industrial Park and Midway Business Park in eastern Knox County and the  WestBridge Industrial Park in western Knox County.

Finance
The largest bank operating in Knoxville in terms of local deposits is Memphis-based First Tennessee, with $2.6billion in local deposits, representing about 16% of Knoxville's banking market. It is followed by Charlotte-based Truist Financial ($2.5billion), Birmingham-based Regions Bank ($1.9billion), and locally headquartered Home Federal Bank of Tennessee ($1.6billion). Other banks with significant operations in the city include Bank of America, First Bank (based in Lexington, Tennessee), and locally owned Clayton Bank and Trust.

Major brokerage firms with offices in Knoxville include Edward Jones, Morgan Stanley Smith Barney, Wells Fargo, and Merrill Lynch. As of 2011, Knox County's largest mortgage lender (by dollar volume) was Wells Fargo with over $300million (13% of the local market), followed by Mortgage Investors Group, SunTrust, Regions, and Home Federal. Knoxville's largest accounting firm as of 2012 is Pershing Yoakley & Associates, with 49 local CPAs, followed by Coulter & Justus (44), and Pugh CPA's(43).

Manufacturing
Over 700 manufacturing establishments are scattered throughout the Knoxville area. Sea Ray Boats is the city's largest manufacturer, employing 760 at its southeast Knoxville complex in 2009. The city is home to several automobile parts operations, including ARC Automotive (air bag actuators) and a Key Safety Systems plant (seat belts and other restraints). Other major manufacturing operations include a Melaleaca plant (personal care products), a Coca-Cola bottling plant, and a Gerdau Ameristeel plant that produces steel rebar. Aircraft manufacturer Cirrus also has its main customer delivery center based in Knoxville, that deals with aircraft maintenance & repair, flight training, and design personalization. Major manufacturing operations in the Knoxville MSA are conducted at the Y-12 plant in Oak Ridge, the DENSO plant and the Clayton Homes manufacturing center (both in Maryville), and the ALCOA plants in Alcoa.

Retail
The Knoxville area is home to 182 shopping centers and factory outlets, and over 2,400 retail establishments. One regional mall (West Town Mall) is located within the city, and two others (Foothills Mall in Maryville and Oak Ridge City Center in Oak Ridge) are located within the Knoxville MSA. Knoxville retailers reported $6.47billion in sales in 2007, with just over $35,000 of retail sales per capita.

Knoxville's primary retail corridor is located along Kingston Pike in West Knoxville. This area is home to West Town Mall, the 358-acre Turkey Creek complex (half is in Knoxville and half is Farragut), and over 30 shopping centers. Downtown Knoxville contains a number of specialty shops, clubs, and dining areas, mostly concentrated in the Old City, Market Square, and along Gay Street. Other significant retail areas are located along Cumberland Avenue on the U.T. campus (mostly restaurants), Broadway in the vicinity of Fountain City, and Chapman Highway in South Knoxville.

Technology and research
The University of Tennessee is classified by the Carnegie Commission as a university with "very high research activity", conducting more than $300million in externally funded research annually. U.T.-connected research centers with multimillion-dollar National Science Foundation grants include the Appalachian Collaborative Center for Learning, Assessment and Instruction in Mathematics, the National Institute for Computational Sciences, the National Institute for Mathematical and Biological Synthesis, and the Center for Ultra-wide-area Resilient Electric Energy Transmission Networks (CURENT). U.T. and the nearby Oak Ridge National Laboratory jointly conduct numerous research projects and co-manage the National Transportation Research Center.

The Tennessee Technology Corridor stretches across  between West Knoxville and Oak Ridge.  The Corridor is home to 13 research and development firms employing nearly 2,000.

Culture

Knoxville is home to a rich arts community and has many festivals throughout the year. Its contributions to old-time, bluegrass and country music are numerous, from Flatt & Scruggs and Homer & Jethro to the Everly Brothers.

The Knoxville Symphony Orchestra (KSO), established in 1935, is the oldest continuing orchestra in the southeast. The KSO maintains a core of full-time professional musicians, and performs at more than 200 events per year. Its traditional venues include the Tennessee Theatre, the Bijou Theatre, and the Civic Auditorium, though it also performs at a number of non-traditional venues.

The Knoxville Opera performs a season of opera every year, accompanied by a chorus. Knoxville was the location of Sergei Rachmaninoff's final concert in 1943, performed at Alumni Memorial Auditorium at the University of Tennessee.

Knoxville's underground music scene is rooted with the promotion by AC Entertainment founder Ashley Capps around 1979. AC Entertainment, a local entertainment group, sought to expand the city's scene. In the 1990s, noted alternative rock critic Ann Powers, author of Weird Like Us: My Bohemian America, referred to the city as "Austin without the hype". Knoxville is also home to a vibrant punk rock scene, having emerged from venues in the Old City district, specifically the Mill & Mine and Pilot Light venues. Its underground music scene in punk and hardcore grew as early as 1979. Such punk and hardcore bands included UXB, the STDs, and Koro. Spurred by Capps, Knoxville hosts the Big Ears music festival since 2009. The festival, dubbed the "most ambitious avant-garde festival in America in more than a decade" in a 2014 Rolling Stone article, hosts musicians ranging from the aforementioned punk rock to chamber pop.

The city also hosts numerous art festivals, including the 17-day Dogwood Arts Festival in April, which features art shows, crafts fairs, food and live music. Also in April is the Rossini Festival, which celebrates opera and Italian culture. June's Kuumba (meaning creativity in Swahili) Festival commemorates the region's African American heritage and showcases visual arts, folk arts, dance, games, music, storytelling, theater, and food.

Appearances in popular culture
Knoxville has appeared in music, literature and television. Film director Quentin Tarantino was born in Knoxville, and the city and East Tennessee are frequently mentioned in his films, such as in the 1994 film Pulp Fiction, in which Bruce Willis' character (and the watch given to him by Christopher Walken's character) is from Knoxville.

A number of films and television programs were filmed in the city, such as the 1999 film October Sky, the 2000 film Road Trip at the University of Tennessee campus,  Box of Moonlight, starring John Turturro and Sam Rockwell, scenes from the 2004 film The Heart Is Deceitful Above All Things, Woman In Hiding, a 1949 film noir starring actress Ida Lupino, and the 2017 film, The Last Movie Star, which was one of the last films to star Burt Reynolds.

In literature, author Cormac McCarthy is from Knoxville, and several of his books feature the city, such as "Suttree", a 1979 semi-autobiographical novel. James Agee also lived in the city, and his 1957 posthumous autobiographical novel A Death in the Family provides a portrait of life in Knoxville, while also wrestling with the death of Agee's father in a car accident, and the impact this had on his family.

Mark Twain wrote about a gunfight in downtown Knoxville involving Joseph Mabry Jr., owner of the city's antebellum Mabry-Hazen House in Life on the Mississippi from 1883. Several other books take place in fictionalized versions of the city, such as the 1915 Anne W. Armstrong novel, The Seas of God, and David Madden's 1974 novel, Bijou, is set in a fictional city known as "Cherokee", based on Knoxville.

The first part of James Herman Robinson's 1950 autobiography, The Road Without Turning, takes place in Knoxville, and "The Man in the Overstuffed Chair", a 1985 short story by playwright Tennessee Williams, gives a brief description of the death of Williams' father, Cornelius, at a Knoxville hospital, and his subsequent burial at Old Gray Cemetery.

Pulitzer Prize-winning author Peter Taylor's last novel in 1994, In the Tennessee Country, refers to a "Knoxville cemetery" where the main character's grandfather (a fictitious politician) is buried. This may refer to Old Gray Cemetery, where Taylor's own grandfather, Governor Robert Love Taylor, was originally buried in 1912.

Swiss travel writer Annemarie Schwarzenbach visited Knoxville in the 1930s, and wrote an essay about the city, "Auf der Schattenseite von Knoxville", which was published in the December 1937 edition of the Swiss magazine, National Zeitung.

A number of songs and music compositions are about or feature Knoxville as well. "The Knoxville Girl", first recorded in 1924, is traditional Appalachian ballad. Classical composer Samuel Barber's "Knoxville: Summer of 1915" from 1947 is a voice & orchestra piece based on 1938 short prose by James Agee. Dire Straits guitarist Mark Knopfler recorded a song entitled "Daddy's Gone to Knoxville" on his 2002 solo album, The Ragpicker's Dream, "The Ballad of Thunder Road" by Robert Mitchum references Knoxville's Bearden community, and other musicians such as Steve Earle, Ronnie Milsap, and Hank Williams, Jr. have mentioned the city in lyrics. Hank Williams, Hank Jr.'s father, spent his last day alive in Knoxville as well. Country singer Kenny Chesney is from Knoxville.

A number of early country music songs were recorded in Knoxville as the "St. James Sessions" in 1930, such as "Satan is Busy In Knoxville" by Leola Manning.

Events
The Knoxville Christmas in the City event runs for eight weeks of events at locations throughout the city including the Singing Christmas Tree and ice skating on the Holidays on Ice skating rink.

 Asian Festival
 Big Ears Festival
 Boo At The Zoo
 Boomsday (discontinued)
 Brewfest
 Concerts on the Square
 Dogwood Arts Festival
 Fantasy of Trees
 Festival on the Fourth
 First Friday ArtWalk
 Greek Fest
 HoLa Festival
 International Biscuit Festival
 Knox Food Fest
 Knoxville Hardcore Fest
 Knoxville Horror Film Festival
 Knoxville Marathon
 Knoxville Powerboat Classic
 Market Square Farmers' Market
 NSRA Street Rod Nationals South
 Pride Fest
 Rhythm & Blooms Festival
 Rossini Festival
 Tennessee Valley Fair
 Vestival
 Volapalooza

Sites of interest

 Beck Cultural Exchange Center
 Bijou Theatre
 Bleak House
 William Blount Mansion
 Fountain City Art Center
 Candoro Marble Works
 Civic Coliseum
 Fort Dickerson
 Haley Heritage Square
 Ijams Nature Center
 James White's Fort
 Knoxville Botanical Gardens and Arboretum
 Knoxville Convention Center
 Knoxville Greenways
 Knoxville Museum of Art
 Knoxville Police Museum
 Zoo Knoxville
 Mabry-Hazen House
 Marble Springs
 Market Square
 Frank H. McClung Museum
 Museum of East Tennessee History
 National Register of Historic Places, Knox County, Tennessee
 Old City
 Ramsey House
 Sunsphere
 Tennessee Amphitheater
 Tennessee River Boat
 Tennessee Theatre
 Three Rivers Rambler Train Ride
 Volunteer Landing
 Women's Basketball Hall of Fame
 World's Fair Park
 Knoxville's Urban Wilderness

Media

The Knoxville News Sentinel is the local daily newspaper in Knoxville, with a daily circulation of 97,844 and a Sunday circulation of 124,225, as of 2011. The city is home to several weekly, bi-weekly, and monthly publications.

As of 2011, the Knoxville television market was the 61st-largest in the U.S. with 527,790 homes, according to Nielsen Market Research. The largest local television station is NBC affiliate WBIR-TV, with 28,305 viewing households, followed by ABC affiliate WATE-TV (23,559), CBS affiliate WVLT-TV (20,052), Fox affiliate WTNZ (10,319), and CW affiliate WBXX-TV (5,415). Other local stations include WKNX-TV (Ind.), WVLR (CTN) and WPXK (Ion). East Tennessee PBS operates Knoxville's Public Broadcasting Service station at WKOP 17.

Discovery, Inc. operates the former Scripps Networks Interactive cable television networks from Knoxville, including HGTV, Magnolia Network, Food Network and Cooking Channel. Jewelry Television, a home shopping channel, is also based in the city, and several companies that provide production services to the ex-SNI networks also maintain Knoxville operations.

According to Arbitron's 2011 Radio Market Rankings, Knoxville had the nation's 72nd largest radio market, with 684,700 households. In 2010, Country music station WIVK (107.7 FM) had the market's highest AQH share at 16.3, followed by adult contemporary station WJXB (97.5 FM) at 10.1, and news/talk station WCYQ (100.3 FM) at 8.3. Other stations include Rock music stations WIMZ (103.5 FM) and WNFZ (94.3), Rhythmic Top 40 station WKHT (104.5 FM), contemporary hit station WWST (102.1 FM), and National Public Radio station WUOT (91.9 FM). The University of Tennessee radio station operates under WUTK (90.3 FM).

Sports
The University of Tennessee's athletics programs, nicknamed the "Volunteers", or "the Vols", are immensely popular in Knoxville and the surrounding region. Neyland Stadium, where the Vols' football team plays, is one of the largest stadiums in the world, and Thompson–Boling Arena, home of the men's and women's basketball teams, is one of the nation's largest indoor basketball arenas. The telephone area code for Knox County and eight adjacent counties is 865 (VOL). Knoxville is also the home of the Women's Basketball Hall of Fame, almost entirely thanks to the success of Pat Summitt and the University of Tennessee women's basketball team.

Professional sports teams located in Knoxville include

 Knoxville Ice Bears (Southern Professional Hockey League) Home games are played at the Knoxville Civic Auditorium and Coliseum
 Tennessee Smokies (Southern League, Double-A baseball affiliate of the Chicago Cubs) Home games are played at Smokies Stadium in Kodak, Tennessee
 One Knoxville SC (USL League One) A professional Men's soccer club who play their home matches at Regal Stadium

In 2019, the Knoxville Force a National Premier Soccer League and Lady Force, an NWPSL Soccer League in the Southeast Division were shuttered.

Government
Knoxville is governed by a mayor and nine-member City Council. It uses the strong-mayor form of the mayor-council system. The council consists of six members from single-member districts and three members elected at-large for the entire city. The council chooses from among its members the vice mayor (currently Gwen McKenzie), the Beer Board chairperson (currently Andrew Roberto), and a representative to the Knoxville Transportation Authority (currently Amelia Parker). The City Council meets every other Tuesday at 7:00p.m. in the Main Assembly Room of the City County Building.

The current mayor is Indya Kincannon, who was sworn in as the city's second female mayor on December 21, 2019, replacing the first female mayor of the city, Madeline Rogero, who was elected in 2011. Interim mayor Daniel Brown, the first African American to hold the office, was appointed in January 2011 following the resignation of Bill Haslam, who was elected Governor of Tennessee. Other recent mayors include Haslam's predecessor, Victor Ashe (1987−2003), Kyle Testerman (1972−1975, 1984−1987), and Randy Tyree (1976−1983).

The Knoxville Fire Department (KFD) provides Class2 ISO service inside the city limits. The fire department operates 19 stations with 308 uniformed personnel. KFD provides firefighting, first responder EMS response, vehicle extrication and HazMat response within the city limits.

The Knoxville Police Department serves the citizens of Knoxville with 378 officers and a total of 530 employees.

911 ambulance service inside Knoxville is provided by AMR Ambulance under contract with Knox County.

Knoxville is home to the Tennessee Supreme Court's courthouse for East Tennessee.

City Council
Knoxville is governed by a mayor and a nine-member City Council, six of which represent from single-member districts and three members are elected at-large. Council members are elected through a nonpartisan, district-wide primary in which top two vote-getters advance to a city-wide runoff election in November. Council members are elected to serve a four-year term that is eligible for reelection once.

List of mayors

Not to be confused with the Mayor of Knox County

Education

Knoxville is home to the main campus of the University of Tennessee (UTK), which has operated in the city since the 1790s. As of 2011, UTK had an enrollment of over 27,000 and endowments of over $300million. The school employs over 1,300 instructional faculty, and offers more than 300 degree programs.

Pellissippi State Community College is a two-year school governed by the Tennessee Board of Regents that offers transfer programs, two-year degrees, and certificate programs. Its main campus is located off Pellissippi Parkway in western Knox County. As of 2011, the school had a system-wide enrollment of over 11,000 students,

Johnson University (formerly Johnson Bible College) is a Bible college affiliated with the Christian churches and churches of Christ. As of 2012, the school had an enrollment of 845. Johnson traditionally specializes in training preachers and ministers, but also offers degrees in counseling, teaching, music, and nonprofit management.

South College (formerly Knoxville Business College) is a for-profit school located in West Knoxville that offers undergraduate and graduate programs in business, health care, criminal justice, and legal fields. The school had an enrollment of 717 as of 2010.

Knoxville College was a historically black college that began operating in Knoxville in the 1870s. The school offered a Bachelor of Science in Liberal Studies and an Associate of Arts degree. Knoxville College had an enrollment of about 100 students as of 2010 and closed permanently in 2015.

Institutions with branch campuses in Knoxville include Carson-Newman University, King University, Lincoln Memorial University (namely, the Duncan School of Law), National College of Business & Technology, Roane State Community College, Strayer University, Tennessee Wesleyan University, and Tusculum College. Virginia College offers career programs in Knoxville. Huntington University of Health Sciences, which offers distance courses in nutrition and health, has its offices in Knoxville.

Primary and secondary education
Public schools in Knoxville are part of the Knox County Schools system, which oversees 89 schools (50 elementary, 14 middle, 14 high, and 11 adult centers) serving over 56,000 students. This system includes five magnet schools and a STEM academy. Knox County high schools had a graduation rate of 86.6%, as of 2011. The average classroom ratio is 14 students per teacher.

Knox County is home to over 50 private and parochial schools, the largest of which include the Christian Academy of Knoxville, the Webb School of Knoxville, Knoxville Catholic High School, Grace Christian Academy, Cedar Springs Weekday School, and Sacred Heart Cathedral School.

Libraries

The Knox County Public Library system consists of the Lawson McGhee Library, located downtown, and 17 branch libraries, overseeing a collection of over 1.3million volumes.

Infrastructure

Health
Knox County's hospital system contains over 2,600 licensed beds in seven general use hospitals and one children's hospital. The city's largest hospital as of 2011 was the University of Tennessee Medical Center, which had 581 beds, followed by Fort Sanders Regional Medical Center (541), Parkwest Medical Center (462), and Physicians Regional (370). The city's largest ambulatory surgery center was the Parkwest Surgery Center, which employed 58 physicians and 35 nurses, followed by the Fort Sanders West Outpatient Surgery Center and the St. Mary's Ambulatory Surgery Center South.

2021 County Health Rankings places Knox county at 13th out the 95 counties. Life expectancy was 76.3 years. Health behaviors noted: 19% smokers vs state average of 21%, 29% of the population is obese vs 33% for the state, excessive drinking is 19% vs 17%, drug overdoses 52 per 100,000 with the state at 28 overdoses per 100,000.

In the 2010s, Knoxville's air quality continued to greatly improve over that of past decades according to the American Lung Association's State of the Air 2017.

Utilities
The Knoxville Utilities Board (KUB) provides electricity, water, and wastewater management to Knoxville residents and businesses. KUB's service area covers 688 square miles and includes over 5,200 miles of power lines providing electricity to over 196,000 customers. The average electric bill was just over $96 per month. KUB purchases its electricity from the Tennessee Valley Authority.

Transportation

Highways

The two principal interstate highways serving Knoxville are Interstate 40, which connects the city to Asheville (directly) and Bristol (via I-81) to the east and Nashville to the west, and Interstate 75, which connects the city to Chattanooga to the south and Lexington to the north. Interstate 640 provides a bypass for I-40 travelers, and Interstate 275 provides a faster connection to I-75 for Downtown travelers headed north. A spur route of I-40, Interstate 140 (Pellissippi Parkway), connects West Knoxville with McGhee Tyson Airport and Maryville.

Prior to its reconstruction for the 1982 World's Fair tourism traffic, the interchange of I-75 (now I-275) and I-40 was known as "Malfunction Junction", because its consistent state of traffic jammed throughout daily.

Knoxville's busiest road is a stretch of U.S. Route 129 known as Alcoa Highway, which connects the Downtown area with McGhee Tyson Airport and Maryville. A merged stretch of US-70 and US-11 enters the city from the east along Magnolia Avenue, winds its way through the Downtown area, crosses the U.T. campus along Cumberland Avenue ("The Strip"), and proceeds through West Knoxville along Kingston Pike. US-11 splits into US-11E and 11W in Downtown, with the former connecting Knoxville to Jefferson City and Morristown, and the latter with Rutledge and Bean Station. US-441, which connects Knoxville to the Great Smoky Mountains National Park, passes along Broadway in North Knoxville, Henley Street in the Downtown area, and Chapman Highway in South Knoxville. US-25W, which enters from the east concurrent with US-70, connects Knoxville with Clinton.

State Route 158 (SR 158) loops around the Downtown area from Kingston Pike just west of UT's campus, southward and eastward along Neyland Drive and the riverfront, and northward along the James White Parkway before terminating at I-40. SR 62 (Western Avenue, Oak Ridge Highway), connects Downtown Knoxville with Oak Ridge to the west. SR 168, known as Governor John Sevier Highway, runs along the eastern and southern periphery of the city. SR 162 (Pellissippi Parkway) connects West Knoxville with Oak Ridge. SR 331 (Tazewell Pike) connects the Fountain City area to rural northeast Knox County. SR 332 (Northshore Drive) connects West Knoxville and Concord. SR 33 (Maryville Pike, Maynardville Pike) traverses much of South Knoxville southward, and connects to the suburbs of Halls Crossroads and Maynardville northward.

Four vehicle bridges connect Downtown Knoxville with South Knoxville, namely the South Knoxville Bridge (James White Parkway), the Gay Street Bridge (Gay Street), the Henley Street Bridge, or Henley Bridge (Henley Street), and the J. E. "Buck" Karnes Bridge (Alcoa Highway). Two railroad bridges, located between the Henley Street Bridge and Buck Karnes Bridge, serve the CSX and Northfolk Southern railroads. Smaller bridges radiating out from the downtown area include the Western Avenue Viaduct and Clinch Avenue Viaduct, the Robert Booker Bridge (Summit Hill Drive), the Hill Avenue Viaduct, and the Gay Street Viaduct.

Mass transit
Public transportation is provided by  Knoxville Area Transit (KAT), which operates over 80 buses, road trolleys, and paratransit vehicles, and transports more than 3.6million passengers per year. Regular routes connect the Downtown area, U.T., and most residential areas with major shopping centers throughout the city. KAT operates using city, state, and federal funds, and passenger fares, and is managed by Veolia Transport.

Airports
Knoxville and the surrounding area is served by McGhee Tyson Airport (IATA:TYS), a  airport equipped with twin  runways. The airport is located south of Knoxville in Alcoa, but is owned by the non-profit Metropolitan Knoxville Airport Authority (MKAA). McGhee Tyson offers eight major airlines serving 19 non-stop destinations, and averages 120 arrivals and departures per day. The airport includes the  Air Cargo Complex, which serves FedEx, UPS, and Airborne Express. The McGhee Tyson Air National Guard Base, located adjacent to the civilian airport, is home to the Tennessee National Guard's 134th Air Refueling Wing.

The MKAA also owns the Downtown Island Airport, a  general aviation facility located on Dickinson's Island in southeast Knoxville. This airport is equipped with a  runway, and averages about 225 operations per day. Over 100 aircraft, mostly single-engine planes, are based at the airport.

Railroads

Rail freight in Knoxville is handled by two Class I railroads, CSX and Norfolk Southern, and one shortline, the Knoxville and Holston River Railroad. Railroads account for about 12% of the Knoxville area's outbound freight and 16% of the area's inbound freight. The city has two major rail terminals: the Burkhart Enterprises terminal at the Forks of the River Industrial Park just east of the city, and the TransFlo facility adjacent to the U.T. campus. Knoxville's two old passenger stations, the Southern Terminal and the L&N Station, now serve non-railroad functions.

The company uses a small rail yard near the I-40/I-275 interchange in Downtown Knoxville for a staging area. The Norfolk Southern system includes spur lines to the coal fields around Middlesboro, Kentucky, and the ALCOA plants in Blount County.

Minor switching operations for CSX occur at the TransFlo facility near the U.T. campus. The CSX system includes spur lines to TVA's Bull Run Fossil Plant and the Oak Ridge National Laboratory in Anderson County, and the ALCOA plants in Blount County.

The Knoxville and Holston River Railroad (KXHR) is a subsidiary of Gulf and Ohio Railways, a shortline holding company headquartered at the James Park House in Downtown Knoxville. The KXHR operates a  line between the Burkhart terminal at Forks of the River and the Coster Yard in North Knoxville, where the freight is transferred to CSX and Norfolk Southern lines or transloaded onto trucks. The KXHR also manages the Knoxville Locomotive Works at the Coster Yard, and operates the Three Rivers Rambler, a tourist train that runs along the riverfront.

Historic passenger service
Until the mid-20th century three railroads and their stations operated regular trains, serving points north, east, south and west: the Louisville and Nashville Railroad's L&N Station (last train operating there, 1968), the Smoky Mountain Railroad's station and the Southern Railway's Southern Terminal (last train operating there, 1970).

River transport
Knoxville is an international port connected via navigable channels to the nation's inland waterways and the Gulf of Mexico. The city's waterfront lies just under 700 river miles from the Mississippi River (via the Tennessee and Ohio rivers), and just under 900 river miles from Mobile, Alabama, on the Gulf of Mexico (via the Tennessee River and Tennessee-Tombigbee Waterway). TVA maintains a minimum  channel on the entirety of the Tennessee River.

Most commercial shipping on the Tennessee River is provided by barges, which deliver on average half a million tons of cargo to Knoxville per year, mostly asphalt, road salt, and steel and coke. Burkhart Enterprises operates the city's most active public barge terminal at its Forks of the River facility, handling approximately 350,000 tons of barge cargo per year. Knoxville Barge and Chattanooga-based Serodino, Inc., provide barge shipping services to and from the city.

Recreational craft that frequent the river include small johnboats, fishing boats and yachts. Boat slips and a marina are located at Volunteer Landing in the Downtown area. The VOL Navy, a flotilla of several dozen boats, swarms the river during weeks when the U.T. football team plays at Neyland Stadium. Cruise lines operating in the city include the Volunteer Princess, a luxury yacht, and the Star of Knoxville, a paddlewheel riverboat.

Sister cities
Knoxville has seven sister cities as designated by Sister Cities International:
  Yesan, Republic of Korea
  Chełm, Lublin Voivodeship, Poland
  Chengdu, Sichuan, People's Republic of China
  Kaohsiung, Republic of China
  Larissa, Greece
  Muroran, Hokkaido, Japan
  Neuquen, Argentina

See also
 National Register of Historic Places listings in Knox County, Tennessee
 List of people from Knoxville, Tennessee

Notes

References

Further reading

 Barber, John W., and Howe, Henry. All the Western States and Territories... (Cincinnati, Ohio: Howe's Subscription Book Concern, 1867). pp.631–632.
 Carey, Ruth. "Change Comes to Knoxville", in These Are Our Voices: The Story of Oak Ridge 1942–1970, edited by James Overholt, Oak Ridge, Tennessee, 1987.
 Deaderick, Lucile, ed. Heart of the Valley—A History of Knoxville, Tennessee Knoxville: East Tennessee Historical Society, 1976.
 Jennifer Long; "Government Job Creation Programs-Lessons from the 1930s and 1940s" Journal of Economic Issues . Volume: 33. Issue: 4. 1999. pp 903+, a case study of Knoxville.
 Isenhour, Judith Clayton. Knoxville, A Pictorial History. (Donning Company, 1978, 1980).
 
 McDonald, Michael, and Bruce Wheeler. Knoxville, Tennessee: Continuity and Change in an Appalachian City University of Tennessee Press, 1983. the standard academic history
 McKenzie, Robert Tracy. Lincolnites and Rebels: A Divided Town in the American Civil War (2009) on Knoxville excerpt and text search
 The Future of Knoxville's Past: Historic and Architectural Resources in Knoxville, Tennessee. (Knoxville Historic Zoning Commission, October 2006).
 Rothrock, Mary U., editor. The French Broad-Holston Country: A History of Knox County, Tennessee. (Knox County Historical Committee; East Tennessee Historical Society, 1946).
 Temple, Oliver P. East Tennessee and the Civil War (1899) 588pp online edition
 Wheeler, Bruce. "Knoxville, Tennessee: A Mountain City in the New South" (University of Tennessee Press, 2005).

External links

 Official website 
 Knoxville Tourism and Sports Corporation
 
 City charter
 Convention and Visitors Bureau

 
Cities in Tennessee
County seats in Tennessee
Tennessee
Cities in Knoxville metropolitan area
East Tennessee
History of voting rights in the United States
Populated places established in 1786
Cities in Knox County, Tennessee
State of Franklin
Tennessee populated places on the Tennessee River
Tennessee populated places on the French Broad River
Populated places on the Underground Railroad
1791 establishments in the Southwest Territory